José António Silvestre Rafael (born 22 November 1958) is a Portuguese retired footballer who played as a striker.

Club career
After starting his professional career with local S.C. Farense in the second division, Rafael spent the following ten seasons in the top level, first appearing rarely with Algarve neighbours Portimonense S.C. over the course of two campaigns. He then signed for Amora F.C. in the 1981 summer, scoring six goals in 25 games in his second year, which ended in relegation.

Rafael returned to Farense for 1983–84, netting a career-best 11 goals as the club eventually avoided relegation. Afterwards, he played three seasons with Boavista FC, appearing in two UEFA Cup editions: on 19 September 1985 he scored twice in a 4–3 home win against Club Brugge KV, albeit in a 5–6 aggregate loss.

Rafael retired from football in June 1989 at nearly 31, after two years with Vitória de Setúbal, amassing top flight totals of 160 matches and 47 goals.

International career
Rafael gained two caps for Portugal, both coming during the 1986 FIFA World Cup qualifiers. He scored on his debut, a 3–2 home win over Malta on 12 October 1985.

|}

External links

1958 births
Living people
People from Faro, Portugal
Portuguese footballers
Association football forwards
Primeira Liga players
Liga Portugal 2 players
S.C. Farense players
Portimonense S.C. players
Amora F.C. players
Boavista F.C. players
Vitória F.C. players
C.F. Os Belenenses players
Portugal youth international footballers
Portugal international footballers
Sportspeople from Faro District